Caithness and Sutherland was a county constituency of the House of Commons of the Parliament of the United Kingdom from 1918 to 1997. It elected one Member of Parliament (MP) by the first past the post system of election.

The constituency was created by merging the constituencies of Caithness and Sutherland and the Dornoch and Wick components of the Wick Burghs constituency.

In 1997 the constituency was superseded by the creation of Caithness, Sutherland and Easter Ross, which merged Caithness and Sutherland and the Easter Ross area of Ross, Cromarty and Skye.

Caithness and Sutherland was geographically one of the largest constituencies in the United Kingdom, as well as the most northerly constituency on the mainland (only the island constituency of Orkney and Shetland was further north).

1918 constituency reform
The creation of Caithness and Sutherland as a single constituency was a part of a package of boundary reform also affecting many other parts of the United Kingdom. The reform was the first since the Redistribution of Seats Act of 1885, and its main aim was to make constituencies more equal in terms of the sizes of their electorates.

Local government areas

1918 to 1975

When created the constituency covered the county of Caithness and the county of Sutherland, including the burghs of Dornoch, Thurso and Wick.

1975 to 1983
In 1975 counties and burghs were abolished and the constituency became an area within the Highland region. The region included two new local government districts, called Caithness and Sutherland. The Caithness district was entirely within the constituency. The Sutherland district had a small area, the Kincardine electoral division, within the Ross and Cromarty constituency.

1983 to 1996
Constituency boundaries were redrawn in 1983, and the Caithness and Sutherland constituency was enlarged to cover the whole of the Sutherland district.

1996 to 1997
In 1996 the districts were abolished and the Highland region became a unitary council area. Throughout the remainder of the life of the constituency the Highland Council had area committees representing the areas of the former districts.

Members of Parliament

At the time of the 1918 general election, Sir Leicester Harmsworth had been MP for the constituency of Caithness since the 1900 general election.

In the general election of 1997 Robert Maclennan was elected MP for the then new constituency of Caithness, Sutherland and Easter Ross, a seat he held until retiring from parliament at the 2001 general election.

Election results

Elections in the 1910s

Elections in the 1920s

Elections in the 1930s

Elections in the 1940s

Elections in the 1950s

Elections in the 1960s

Elections in the 1970s

Elections in the 1980s

Elections in the 1990s

References

See also
 Former United Kingdom Parliament constituencies

Historic parliamentary constituencies in Scotland (Westminster)
Constituencies of the Parliament of the United Kingdom established in 1918
Constituencies of the Parliament of the United Kingdom disestablished in 1997
Politics of the county of Caithness
Politics of the county of Sutherland
Highland constituencies, UK Parliament (historic)